The Last of the Mohicans is a 1992 American epic historical drama film set in 1757 during the French and Indian War. It was directed by Michael Mann and was based on the 1826 novel The Last of the Mohicans: A Narrative of 1757 by James Fenimore Cooper and the 1936 film adaptation, owing more to the film than the novel. The film stars Daniel Day-Lewis and Madeleine Stowe, with Jodhi May, Russell Means, Wes Studi, Eric Schweig, and Steven Waddington in supporting roles.

The soundtrack features music by Trevor Jones and Randy Edelman, and the song "I Will Find You" by Clannad. The main theme of the film is taken from the tune "The Gael" by Scottish singer-songwriter Dougie MacLean.

Released in the United States on September 25, 1992, The Last of the Mohicans was met with positive reviews and commercial success during its box-office run. It won the Academy Award for Best Sound, the only Oscar won so far by a film directed by Mann. Day-Lewis received his second nomination for the BAFTA Award for Best Actor in a Leading Role for his performance.

Plot
In 1757, British Army Major Duncan Heyward arrives in Albany, New York, during the French and Indian War. He is assigned to Colonel Edmund Munro, the commander of Fort William Henry in the Adirondack Mountains. Heyward is tasked with escorting Munro's two daughters, Cora and Alice, to their father. Before they leave, Heyward asks Cora to marry him, but she asks for more time before giving her answer.

A Mohawk named Magua is tasked with guiding Heyward, the two women, and a troop of British soldiers to the fort, but he is actually a Huron who leads them into an ambush that kills most of the soldiers. Mohican Chingachgook, his son Uncas, and his white, adopted son "Hawkeye" arrive and kill all of the Hurons except Magua, who escapes. The trio agrees to take the women and Heyward to the fort. During the trek, they find another massacre at a farm, but do not stop to bury the victims so as not to alert the Hurons to their presence. Cora and Hawkeye are attracted to each other, as are Uncas and Alice.

They find the fort under siege by the French and their Huron allies, but manage to sneak in. Colonel Munro is surprised to see his daughters, as he had sent a letter warning them to stay away, but it never reached them. Heyward becomes jealous of Hawkeye when Cora tells Heyward she will not accept his marriage proposal. A militiaman sets out at night to try to reach General Webb at Fort Edward for reinforcements, with Hawkeye, Chingachgook and Uncas providing covering fire from the fort.

After Munro refuses to honor an agreement made by Webb that the militiamen could leave to protect their homesteads if they were threatened, Hawkeye helps them sneak away. He is arrested for sedition and sentenced to hang. However, when he learns that Webb will send no soldiers, Munro is forced to accept French General Louis-Joseph de Montcalm's terms of surrender: the British can leave the fort honorably with their arms. Magua is furious because he bears a personal grudge against Munro.

Once Munro, his soldiers and civilians leave the fort, Huron warriors attack and massacre them. Munro is captured alive, but mortally wounded, and Magua personally promises him that he'll kill his daughters, then cuts out his heart. Hawkeye, Uncas, and Chingachgook fight their way out, taking Cora, Alice, Heyward, and a few British soldiers. They hide in a cave behind a waterfall, but Magua finds them. Before Hawkeye, Uncas, and Chingachgook escape by leaping from the waterfall, Hawkeye tells Cora to stay alive and swears that he will find her.

Magua takes his three prisoners to a Huron settlement. While he is addressing a sachem, Hawkeye walks in unarmed as a parley to plead for their lives. The sachem rules that Heyward is to be returned to the British, Alice be given to Magua for the wrongs done to him by Munro, and Cora be burned alive. Although Hawkeye is told he may leave in peace for his bravery, he offers to take Cora's place. Heyward, who is acting as interpreter, instead tells the Hurons to take his life for Cora's. After Hawkeye leaves the village with Cora he shoots Heyward, who is being burned alive, as a final act of mercy.

Chingachgook, Uncas, and Hawkeye then pursue Magua's party to rescue Alice. Uncas races ahead and kills several of the Hurons in combat, but is killed in a duel by Magua and thrown off the cliff's edge. Devastated to see Uncas’ demise, Alice refuses to remain with Magua and commits suicide by jumping off the same cliff. Enraged, Hawkeye and Chingachgook catch up to the Hurons and slay many of them. Hawkeye then holds the rest at gunpoint, allowing Chingachgook to fight and kill Magua, avenging Uncas’ death. Afterward, Chingachgook prays to the Great Spirit to receive Uncas, proclaiming himself "the last of the Mohicans."

Cast
 Daniel Day-Lewis as Nathaniel "Hawkeye" Poe
 Madeleine Stowe as Cora Munro
 Russell Means as Chingachgook
 Eric Schweig as Uncas
 Jodhi May as Alice Munro
 Steven Waddington as Major Duncan Heyward
 Wes Studi as Magua
 Maurice Roëves as Colonel Edmund Munro
 Patrice Chéreau as General Louis-Joseph de Montcalm
 Edward Blatchford as Jack Winthrop
 Terry Kinney as John Cameron
 Tracey Ellis as Alexandra Cameron
 Dennis Banks as Ongewasgone
 Pete Postlethwaite as Captain Beams
 Colm Meaney as Major Ambrose
 Mac Andrews as General Webb
 Malcolm Storry as Phelps
 David Schofield as Sergeant Major
 Eric D. Sandgren as Coureur de Bois
 Mark Edrys as Captain Bougainville
 Tim Hopper as Ian
 Jared Harris as British Lieutenant
 Sebastian Roché as Martin

Production

Development
Much care was taken with recreating accurate costumes and props. Daniel Winkler made the tomahawks used in the film and knifemaker Randall King made the knives. Wayne Watson is the maker of Hawkeye's "Killdeer" rifle used in the film. The gunstock war club made for Chingachgook was created by Jim Yellow Eagle. Magua's tomahawk was made by Fred A. Mitchell of Odin Forge & Fabrication.

Costumes were originally designed by multiple Academy Award winner James Acheson, but he left the film and had his name removed because of artistic differences with Mann. Designer Elsa Zamparelli was brought in to finish.

Casting

Through the making of this film, actors Wes Studi and Maurice Roeves became lifelong friends.

Locations
Although the story takes place in upstate colonial New York, filming was done mostly in the Blue Ridge Mountains of North Carolina. Locations used include Lake James, Chimney Rock Park and The Biltmore Estate. Some of the waterfalls that were used in the movie include Hooker Falls, Triple Falls, Bridal Veil Falls, and High Falls, all located in the DuPont State Recreational Forest.  Another of these falls was Linville Falls, in the mountains of North Carolina. Also, Hickory Nut Falls at Chimney Rock was in the movie near the end. Scenes of Albany were shot in Asheville, North Carolina at The Manor on Charlotte Street.

The set of Fort William Henry was constructed at a reported cost of US$6 million on felled forestry land adjacent to Lake James in North Carolina. Highway 126, which ran between the set and the lake, had to be closed for the duration of the filming.

Soundtrack

Release
The film opened in the United States on September 25, 1992, in 1,856 theaters. It was the number 1 movie on its opening weekend. By the end of its first weekend, The Last of the Mohicans had generated $10,976,661, and by the end of its domestic run, the film had made $75,505,856 in the United States and Canada. It was ranked the 17th highest-grossing film of 1992 in the United States. Internationally, the film grossed more than $67 million for a worldwide total of over $143 million.

Alternate versions
When the film was released theatrically in the United States, its running time was 112 minutes. This version of the film was released on VHS in the U.S. on June 23, 1993. The film was later re-edited to a length of 117 minutes, for its U.S. DVD release on November 23, 1999, which was billed as the "Director's Expanded Edition". The film was again re-edited for its U.S. Blu-ray release on October 5, 2010, this time billed as the "Director's Definitive Cut", with a length of 114 mins. At Mann's insistence, all home video releases of the film, including in its original VHS releases, have been presented in the original theatrical aspect ratio.

Reception

At review aggregation website Rotten Tomatoes the film has a "Certified Fresh" rating of 93% based on reviews from 45 critics, with an average rating of 7.9/10. The site's consensus states: "The Last of the Mohicans is a breathless romantic adventure that plays loose with history -- and comes out with a richer action movie for it."

The Last of the Mohicans opened with critics praising the film for its cinematography and music. Critic Roger Ebert of the Chicago Sun-Times gave the film three stars and called it "quite an improvement on Cooper's all but unreadable book, and a worthy successor to the Randolph Scott version," going on to say that "The Last of the Mohicans is not as authentic and uncompromised as it claims to be – more of a matinee fantasy than it wants to admit – but it is probably more entertaining as a result."

Desson Howe of The Washington Post classified the film as "glam-opera" and "the MTV version of gothic romance". Rita Kempley of the Post recognized the "heavy drama," writing that the film "sets new standards when it comes to pent-up passion", but commented positively on the "spectacular scenery".

Awards and nominations

American Film Institute recognition:
 AFI's 100 Years...100 Heroes and Villains:
 Hawkeye - Nominated Hero

References

External links

Kristopher Tapley: Michael Mann looks back on 'The Last of the Mohicans' 20 years later at uproxx.com
 
 
 
 
 

1992 films
1992 action films
1992 action drama films
1992 drama films
1992 multilingual films
1990s American films
1990s English-language films
1990s French-language films
1990s historical drama films
1990s war drama films
20th Century Fox films
American action drama films
American historical drama films
American multilingual films
American war drama films
American war epic films
BAFTA winners (films)
Films about Native Americans
Films about the British Army
Films based on adaptations
Films based on The Last of the Mohicans
Films directed by Michael Mann
Films produced by Michael Mann
Films scored by Randy Edelman
Films scored by Trevor Jones
Films set in 1757
Films set in Albany, New York
Films set in forests
Films shot in North Carolina
Films that won the Best Sound Mixing Academy Award
Films with screenplays by John L. Balderston
Films with screenplays by Christopher Crowe (screenwriter)
Films with screenplays by Michael Mann
Historical epic films
Mohawk-language films
Morgan Creek Productions films
Murder in films
Native American action films
Native American drama films
Remakes of American films
Warner Bros. films